Esenbeckia leiocarpa is a species of flowering plant in the citrus family, Rutaceae, that is endemic to Brazil.  It is threatened by habitat loss.

References

leiocarpa
Plants described in 1874
Flora of Brazil
Vulnerable plants
Taxonomy articles created by Polbot